Ravna is a settlement and archeological site near Knjaževac, Serbia. The population of the Ravna is 252, while the population of the settlement is 236 (2002 census).
In ancient times it was known as Timacum Minus, while archeological site nearby still hold that name. The Regional Museum in Knjaževac is in charge of preserving Timacum Minus.

References

External links
 www.Wikimapia.org - Ravna, Timacum Minus
 Map on Maplandia

Populated places in Zaječar District
Timok Valley